Bruce S. Pavitt (born March 7, 1959) is the Chicago-born co-founder of independent record label Sub Pop. He attended Evergreen State College where he hosted a show on Evergreen's KAOS radio station before founding Sub Pop.

History
After briefly attending Blackburn College in Carlinville, Illinois and subsequently transferring to The Evergreen State College in Washington State, Pavitt started a fanzine entitled Subterranean Pop in Olympia, Washington in 1980, about American independent rock bands. Pavitt wrote:

“We need diverse, regionalized, localized approaches to all forms of art, music, and politics…the most intense music, the most original ideas are coming out of scenes you don’t even know exist. Tomorrow’s pop is being realized today on small decentralized record labels that are interested in taking risks, not making money.”—Subterranean Pop #1, 1980

Three cassette compilations were released through the fanzine.  In 1983, Pavitt moved to Seattle and started a record store, Fallout, as well as writing a Sub Pop column for The Rocket, and hosting an independent-label specialty show on KCMU. 1986 saw the release of Sub Pop's (the "-terranean" was dropped earlier from the name) first LP: the Sub Pop 100. Green River's Dry As a Bone EP followed in 1987.

Bruce Pavitt has since written two books: Sub Pop USA and Experiencing Nirvana.

References

External links
The Seattle Tattler #2.  "Counting the Cobainbuck$".  Belltown Messenger, February 2005.

Living people
People from Chicago
People from Olympia, Washington
Sub Pop
1959 births